Allambie Heights is a suburb of Northern Sydney, in the state of New South Wales, Australia 17.5 kilometres north-east of the Sydney central business district in the local government area of Northern Beaches Council. It is part of the Northern Beaches region.

History 
Allambie is an Aboriginal word that means "peaceful place".  An estate by that name was subdivided and auctioned in 1918. It is likely that a "goat track" that roughly follows the existing Allambie Road today was used by the Aboriginal people to access the ocean beaches at nearby Manly.  The suburb was developed in the late 1940s and early 1950s. Allambie Heights Post Office opened on 1 February 1961.

Many of the streets in Allambie Heights are named after notable battles (particularly where Australian Troops served), and prominent allied political leaders of World War II.  These include Moresby Place, Owen Stanley Avenue, Wewak Place, Kirra Road, Libya Crescent, Derna Crescent, Tobruk Avenue, Tia-Drew Parade, Anzio Avenue, Roosevelt Avenue and Churchill Crescent. Darmour Ave is probably named after the Battle of Damour and simply a misspelling.

Heritage listings 
Allambie Heights has a number of heritage-listed sites, including:

 Manly Dam
Allambie Heights Public School
The IGA
The Oval

Demographics 
The most common countries of birth were England 7.6%, New Zealand 2.1%, China 1.8% and Italy 1.6%. 83.9% of people only spoke English at home. Other languages spoken at home included Mandarin 1.8% and Italian 1.6%. The most common responses for religious affiliation were No Religion 33.7%, Catholic 28.1%, and Anglican 18.1%.

Commercial area 
The main business area in Allambie Heights consists of an IGA supermarket, newsagent, coffee shops, Chubby Fish and Chip shop, pizza, Indian, Thai, gift shop, bakery, Strand 22 Hair & Beauty, community centre and the local primary school. It is also home to the Warringah Aquatic Centre. The suburb is also home to a range of retirement villages including the Italian Scalabrini Village and the German Lutheran Homes. There are also a number of care centres for the disabled including The Sunnyfield Association, The Cerebral Palsy Alliance and Allambie Special School.

Education
Allambie Heights is home to three schools:
 Allambie Heights Public School
 Arranounbai School
 The Beach School

Parks

Allambie Heights is bordered to the south by Manly Dam Reserve (also known as War Memorial Reserve), which is the habitat for a number of species of plants and animals. The area is also home to a number of Australian Aboriginal rock carvings, one of the outstanding examples being the group in Gumbooya Reserve. Garigal National Park sits on the western border.

To the north, Allambie Heights is bordered by Allenby Park, which includes small patches of rainforest and is bisected by small creeks and waterfalls. Bushfires have destroyed much of the bushland area in recent years, however this is part of the Australian ecology cycle and the forests regenerate fairly quickly.

References 

Suburbs of Sydney
Northern Beaches Council